The Guinea-Bissau national football team (Portuguese: Seleção nacional de futebol da Guiné-Bissau) represents Guinea-Bissau in men's international association football and it is controlled by the Football Federation of Guinea-Bissau, The team has never qualified for the FIFA World Cups but qualified for the Africa Cup of Nations three times, making their debut in 2017. The team is a member of both FIFA and Confederation of African Football (CAF).

History

World Cup qualifying
Guinea-Bissau entered their first FIFA World Cup qualification with the aim of reaching the 1998 World Cup in France. The first round of African qualification required for them to play Guinea in a two-legged match. The first leg was held at home in the Estadio 24 de Setembro in Bissau on 1 June 1996 with an attendance of 15,000. Guinea-Bissau went 2–0 up at half-time after strikes from Pereira Tavares in 11th and 36th minutes. Guinea's Titi Camara equalised with his own brace in the 53rd and 54th minutes. Guinea-Bissau's Co Cipriano won the game with a 60th-minute penalty to make it 3–2. The away leg was held at the Stade du 28 Septembre in Conakry. Momo Soumah of Guinea scored to level the tie at half-time before Nando Có scored a bicycle kick for Guinea-Bissau to put his side 4–3 up on aggregate, however another goal from Momo Soumah and a winner from Tibou Bangoura won the match for Guinea, giving them a 5–4 lead on aggregate.

Guinea-Bissau had never progressed beyond the first round of qualification until the 2022 qualifiers where they defeated São Tomé and Príncipe 3–1 over two legs, thanks to three goals from Joseph Mendes.

Africa Cup of Nations
Guinea-Bissau first participated in AFCON qualification in 1994 where they defeated Cape Verde over three legs, but failed to register a single point in the second round as their draw against Togo was annulled after Togo withdrew from the competition. In 1996 Guinea-Bissau withdrew from qualification after a draw and two losses to begin the campaign, leading to their ban for 1998 AFCON.

Guinea-Bissau next entered qualification in 2006 where they lost 4–1 to Mali national football team and were again banned in 2008 for unpaid debts to CAF. In 2012 they secured a single win (1–0 against Kenya) and five losses to finish last in Group J. The following year they were eliminated 2–0 by Cameroon. In 2015, after beating Central African Republic 3–1, they lost to Botswana by the same scoreline.

For the 2017 qualifiers, Guinea-Bissau was drawn from Pot 4 into Group E and, despite being the lowest ranked nation in their group, achieved ten points and qualified for the 2017 tournament ahead of Congo, Zambia and Kenya. In their African Cup of Nations debut, Guinea-Bissau drew 1–1 with Gabon with a 91st-minute equaliser by Juary Soares. This was the only point they collected at the tournament and they were eliminated in the group stage.

Guinea-Bissau then also won their Group in the 2019 qualifiers to reach a second straight Finals. They again managed one draw (0–0 against Benin) and two losses and failed to progress to the knock-out stages.

On March 30, 2021, Guinea-Bissau went into their final qualifying match against Congo, needing a victory to qualify. They ended comfortable winners with goals from Piqueti, Frédéric Mendy and Jorginho to secure their third successive AFCON appearance.

Results and fixtures

2022

2023

Coaching history

  Guilherme Farinha (1990–1994)
  Armando Antonio Miranda (2000)
  Baciro Candé (2001–2009)
  Luís Norton de Matos (2010–2012)
  Carlos Manuel (2012–2014)
  Paulo Torres (2014–2016)
  Baciro Candé (2016–present)

Players

Current squad
The following players were called up for the 2023 AFCON qualification matches against Nigeria on 24 and 27 March 2023.

Caps and goals correct as of 20 November 2022, after the match against .

Recent call-ups
The following players have been called up for Guinea-Bissau in the last 12 months.

DEC Player refused to join the team after the call-up.
INJ Player withdrew from the squad due to an injury.
PRE Preliminary squad.
RET Player has retired from international football.
SUS Suspended from the national team.
WD Withdrew from squad.

Records

Players in bold are still active with Guinea Bissau.

Competition records

FIFA World Cup record

Africa Cup of Nations record

Honours
Amilcar Cabral Cup :
1 Time Runners-up

References

External links

Official Facebook profile
Official football federeation
SOU DJURTU
Guinea-Bissau FIFA

 
African national association football teams